Blackcraig Hill  is a hill in the Carsphairn and Scaur Hills range, part of the Southern Uplands of Scotland. It lies southeast of the town of New Cumnock in Ayrshire. A craggy hill, it is usually climbed from its western side starting at Glen Afton.

References

Marilyns of Scotland
Grahams
Donald mountains
Mountains and hills of the Southern Uplands
Mountains and hills of East Ayrshire